The Lancashire Regiment (Prince of Wales's Volunteers) was an infantry regiment of the British Army that had a very short existence.

History
The regiment was formed, as a consequence of defence cuts instigated by the 1957 Defence White Paper, by the amalgamation of the 1st Battalion, East Lancashire Regiment and the 1st Battalion, South Lancashire Regiment (The Prince of Wales's Volunteers) on 1 July 1958.

The regiment was first based in Hong Kong where both of its predecessor regiments had been based when they amalgamated. In 1961 the regiment arrived in Hilden, West Germany as part of the British Army of the Rhine. Shortly after Swaziland's first-ever elections in 1964, the regiment arrived in there to maintain order. The regiment remained in that country until early the following year when it returned to Britain, being based in Catterick.

In 1967 the Lancashires arrived in Aden in the Middle East a number of months before Aden gained independence from the British Empire. In 1968 the regiment was posted to the garrison in Malta. The following year the Lancashires again returned home to the United Kingdom.

On 25 March 1970, after a relatively brief existence, the regiment was amalgamated with the 1st Battalion, Loyal Regiment (North Lancashire), to form the 1st Battalion, Queen's Lancashire Regiment.

Regimental museum
The Lancashire Infantry Museum is based at Fulwood Barracks in Preston.

Alliances
Alliances were as follows:
 The Princess of Wales' Own Regiment — Canada (1958-1970)
 The West Nova Scotia Regiment — Canada (1958-1970)
 40th Infantry Battalion (The Derwent Regiment) — Australia (1958-1960)
 The Royal Tasmania Regiment — Australia (1967-1970)
 The Hawke's Bay Regiment — New Zealand
 8th Battalion, The Punjab Regiment — Pakistan

References

Lancashire Regiment (Prince of Wales's Volunteers)
Lancashire Regiment (Prince of Wales's Volunteers)
Military units and formations in Lancashire
Military units and formations established in 1958
Military units and formations disestablished in 1970
1958 establishments in the United Kingdom